Georg Heinrich Maria Kirstein (2 July 1858, Mainz – 15 April 1921, Mainz) was a German Roman Catholic clergyman. From 1904 until his death he served as Bishop of Mainz.

References

External links
http://www.catholic-hierarchy.org/bishop/bkirstein.html 

1858 births
1921 deaths
Bishops of Mainz (1802-present)
Clergy from Mainz